Almaan is a village in the Taiz Governorate, Yemen, belonging administratively to Mawiyah District. It has a population of 717 people, according to statistics in 2004.

Populated places in Taiz Governorate
Villages in Yemen